The 1972 United States elections was held on November 7, and elected the members of the 93rd United States Congress. The election took place during the later stages of the Vietnam War. The Republican Party won a landslide victory in the presidential election, and picked up seats in the House, but the Democratic Party easily retained control of Congress. This was the first election after the ratification of the 26th Amendment granted the right to vote to those aged 18–20.

Incumbent Republican President Richard Nixon won re-election, defeating Democratic Senator George McGovern from South Dakota. Nixon won a landslide victory, taking just under 61% of the popular vote and winning every state but Massachusetts and Washington, D. C. Libertarian John Hospers won the electoral vote of one faithless elector. McGovern won the Democratic nomination, after defeating Washington Senator Henry M. Jackson, Alabama Governor George Wallace, and New York Congresswoman Shirley Chisholm. This was the first presidential election after the McGovern–Fraser Commission (which McGovern himself had chaired) caused an increase in the number of states holding primary elections.

In the House, the Republican Party picked up twelve seats, but Democrats easily retained a majority. In the Senate, the Democratic Party picked up two seats, increasing their majority. The House elections took place after the 1970 United States Census and the subsequent Congressional re-apportionment.

In the gubernatorial elections, Democrats won a net gain of one seat.

See also
1972 United States presidential election
1972 United States House of Representatives elections
1972 United States Senate elections
1972 United States gubernatorial elections
1970 United States redistricting cycle

References

 
1972